8549 Alcide, provisional designation , is a stony Nysa asteroid from the inner regions of the asteroid belt, approximately 4.2 kilometers in diameter. It was discovered on 30 March 1994, by a group of amateur astronomers at the Farra d'Isonzo Observatory, Italy, near the border to Slovenia. It was named for Alcide Bittesini, father of co-discoverer Luciano Bittesini.

Orbit and classification 

Alcide is a member of the stony subgroup of the Nysa family, one of the smaller families in the main-belt, named after its namesake, 44 Nysa. The body orbits the Sun in the inner main-belt at a distance of 2.0–2.9 AU once every 3 years and 10 months (1,390 days). Its orbit has an eccentricity of 0.19 and an inclination of 2° with respect to the ecliptic. Precoveries were taken at Palomar and Steward Observatory (Kitt Peak) just weeks and days prior to the asteroid's official discovery observation at Farra d'Isonzo.

Physical characteristics

Lightcurves 

A rotational lightcurve of Alcide was obtained from photometric observations made by astronomer David Polishook at the ground-based Wise Observatory, Israel, in November 2007. The lightcurve gave a rotation period of  hours with a brightness amplitude of 0.2 magnitude.

Diameter and albedo 

According to the survey carried out by the NEOWISE mission of NASA's space-based Wide-field Infrared Survey Explorer, Alcide measures 4.3 kilometers in diameter and its surface has an albedo of 0.195, while the Collaborative Asteroid Lightcurve Link assumes a standard albedo for stony asteroids of 0.21 and calculates a diameter of 4.2 kilometers with an absolute magnitude of 14.2.

Naming 

This minor planet was named for Italian high-school teacher of natural sciences, Alcide Bittesini (1913–1981). He was the father of amateur astronomer Luciano Bittesini, who co-discovered the asteroid with his amateur colleagues at the Farra d'Isonzo Observatory in Italy.

At the age of 9, his father fostered his interest in astronomy, when they observed a comet with a homespun telescope made of a pair of glasses, a tin can and a microscope eyepiece. The official naming citation was published by the Minor Planet Center on 2 February 1999.

References

External links 
 Asteroid Lightcurve Database (LCDB), query form (info )
 Dictionary of Minor Planet Names, Google books
 Asteroids and comets rotation curves, CdR – Observatoire de Genève, Raoul Behrend
 Discovery Circumstances: Numbered Minor Planets (5001)-(10000) – Minor Planet Center
 
 

008549
008549
Named minor planets
19940330